William Lowson Mitchell-Thomson, 1st Baron Selsdon   (15 April 1877 – 24 December 1938), known as Sir William Mitchell-Thomson, 2nd Baronet, from 1918 to 1932, was a Scottish politician who served as British Postmaster-General from 1924 till 1929.

Biography

Mitchell-Thomson was born at number 7 Carlton Terrace, Edinburgh, the son of Mitchell Mitchell-Thomson, Lord Provost of Edinburgh, who was created a baronet in 1900.

Mitchell-Thomson was educated at Winchester College and Balliol College, Oxford. He earned his LL.B with distinction from the University of Edinburgh in 1902. He joined the Scottish bar that same year, but spent several years traveling before returning to Scotland.

He was elected as a Unionist Member of Parliament for North West Lanarkshire in 1906, serving until his defeat at the January 1910 general election. He was an Irish Unionist Party MP for North Down from April 1910 until 1918.

During the First World War, he served as Director of Restriction of Enemy Supplies.  He was appointed a Commander of the Order of the British Empire in the 1918 New Year Honours.

Following the War, he was appointed the British representative on the Supreme Economic Council followed by appointments as Parliamentary Secretary to the Ministry of Food and at the Board of Trade.

He was then MP for Glasgow Maryhill between 1918 and 1922, then Conservative MP for Croydon South, South London from 1923 to 1932.

In 1922, Mitchell-Thomson was Parliamentary Secretary to the Board of Trade and from 1924 until 1929, he served as Postmaster General. During the General Strike of 1926, he served as Chief Civil Commissioner. He was made a Privy Counsellor in 1924.

In 1932, Mitchell-Thomson resigned from the House of Commons and was raised to the peerage as Baron Selsdon, of Croydon in the County of Surrey.

In May 1934 the British government appointed a committee, under the guidance of Lord Selsdon, to begin enquiries into the viability of setting up a public television service, with recommendations as to the conditions under which such a service could be offered. The results of the Selsdon Report were issued as a single Government White Paper in January of the following year. The BBC was to be entrusted with the development of television. Lord Selsdon was one of those to appear on the first day of BBC television broadcasts, 2 November 1936, now in his new capacity as Chairman of the Television Advisory Committee.

Personal life
Mitchell-Thomson was twice married. In 1907, he firstly married Madeleine, daughter of Sir Malcolm McEacharn, who was also known as Anne. They had a daughter who died in infancy, and a son, Peter. The marriage ended in divorce in 1932. The next year, he married Effie Lilian Loder Johnson, who as Effie Cook was a member of Pelissier's Follies.

Lord Selsdon died at his home in 20 Grosvenor Square, London, in December 1938, aged 61, and was cremated at Golders Green Crematorium, his ashes later buried in Edinburgh. He was succeeded in his titles by his eldest son Peter, who became a well-known racing driver.

References

External links

 

1877 births
1938 deaths
Politicians from Edinburgh
Barons in the Peerage of the United Kingdom
Members of the Privy Council of the United Kingdom
Mitchell-Thomson, William
Conservative Party (UK) hereditary peers
Mitchell-Thomson, William
Mitchell-Thomson, William
Mitchell-Thomson, William
Mitchell-Thomson, William
Mitchell-Thomson, William
Politics of the London Borough of Croydon
United Kingdom Postmasters General
Knights Commander of the Order of the British Empire
Mitchell-Thomson, William
Mitchell-Thomson, William
Mitchell-Thomson, William
Mitchell-Thomson, William
Mitchell-Thomson, William
Mitchell-Thomson, William
UK MPs who were granted peerages
Parliamentary Secretaries to the Board of Trade
Maryhill
Barons created by George V